Pescadito was a town near Laredo in southwestern Webb County, Texas, United States. Pescadito was a stop on the Texas Mexican Railway in 1881. In 1930 it had a population of 25. The community's main business was mesquite wood for railroads until coal began to be used in 1946.

References

Geography of Webb County, Texas
Ghost towns in South Texas